Martin Schaudt (born 7 December 1958 in Balingen, Baden-Württemberg) is a German equestrian and Olympic champion. He won a gold medal in team dressage at 
the 1996 Summer Olympics in Atlanta with the team from Germany.

He also received a gold medal with the German team in 2004.

References

External links

1958 births
Living people
German dressage riders
Olympic equestrians of Germany
German male equestrians
Equestrians at the 1996 Summer Olympics
Equestrians at the 2004 Summer Olympics
Olympic gold medalists for Germany
Olympic medalists in equestrian
Medalists at the 2004 Summer Olympics
Medalists at the 1996 Summer Olympics
Sportspeople from Tübingen (region)
People from Balingen